The 2012 Monaco GP3 Series round was the second round of the 2012 GP3 Series season. It was held on May 24–26, 2012 at Circuit de Monaco, Monte Carlo, Monaco. The race was used to support the 2012 Monaco Grand Prix. 2012 marked the first time that the GP3 Series held at the Circuit de Monaco.

Classification

Qualifying
As with the GP2 Series qualifying, qualifying for the GP3 Series race saw the drivers split into two groups. Group A was formed by cars with even numbers and Group B by those with odd numbers.

Group A

Group B

Notes:
 — William Buller was given a five-place grid penalty for causing an avoidable accident during the second race in Barcelona.

Qualifying summary

Race 1

Race 2

Notes:
 — Dmitry Suranovich was excluded from the race results for ignoring the stewards' directions to pit as his car was damaged, resulting in a collision with Conor Daly.

Standings after the round

Drivers' Championship standings

Teams' Championship standings

 Note: Only the top five positions are included for both sets of standings.

See also 
 2012 Monaco Grand Prix
 2012 Monaco GP2 Series round

References

Monaco
GP3
Motorsport in Monaco